Geraint Walsh (born 19 May 1988) is a Welsh rugby union player who plays for Cardiff Blues regional team as a centre, wing or fullback.

Walsh made his debut for the Cardiff Blues regional team in 2014 having previously played for Llantwit Fardre RFC, Pontypridd RFC and Western Pioneers RFC, Auckland. While studying at Loughborough University he was a member of the team that won the 2010 British Universities Cup and also represented Welsh Academicals.

References

External links 
Cardiff Blues Player Profile

Rugby union players from Pontypridd
Welsh rugby union players
Cardiff Rugby players
Living people
1988 births